Diderot is a small lunar impact crater on the far side of the Moon. It lies within the southwestern interior floor of the huge walled plain Fermi, about midway between the basin midpoint and the southwest rim. The crater is saucer-shaped, with smaller craters located just to the northwest and the north. The inner wall is narrower along the eastern side, and has a pair of ridges along the southern face. This crater is otherwise unremarkable.

References

External links
 LTO-101B4 Babakin — L&PI topographic map

Impact craters on the Moon